Darioconus is a subgenus  of sea snails, marine gastropod mollusks in the genus Conus, family Conidae, the cone snails and their allies.

In the new classification of the family Conidae by Puillandre N., Duda T.F., Meyer C., Olivera B.M. & Bouchet P. (2015), Darioconus has become a subgenus of Conus: Conus (Darioconus) Tucker & Tenorio, 2013  represented as Conus Thiele, 1929

Distinguishing characteristics
The Tucker & Tenorio 2009 taxonomy distinguishes Darioconus from Conus in the following ways:

 Genus Conus Linnaeus, 1758
 Shell characters (living and fossil species)
The basic shell shape is conical to elongated conical, has a deep anal notch on the shoulder, a smooth periostracum and a small operculum. The shoulder of the shell is usually nodulose and the protoconch is usually multispiral. Markings often include the presence of tents except for black or white color variants, with the absence of spiral lines of minute tents and textile bars.
Radular tooth (not known for fossil species)
The radula has an elongated anterior section with serrations and a large exposed terminating cusp, a non-obvious waist, blade is either small or absent and has a short barb, and lacks a basal spur.
Geographical distribution
These species are found in the Indo-Pacific region.
Feeding habits
These species eat other gastropods including cones.

 Subgenus Darioconus Iredale, 1930
Shell characters (living and fossil species)
The shell is ovate in shape.  The protoconch can be paucispiral or multispiral, poorly developed nodules die out in the early postnuclear whorls, and the sides of the body whole are convex.  The anal notch is moderate to shallow.  The shell does not have textile bars, but is ornamented with spiral lines of minute tents.  The periostracum is smooth, and the operculum is small.
Radular tooth (not known for fossil species)
The anterior section of the radula is substantially more elongated than the posterior section.  The waist is not obvious.  A basal spur is absent, and the blade and barb is short.  A terminating cusp is present.
Geographical distribution
These species are found in the Indo-Pacific region.
Feeding habits
These species are molluscivorous (meaning that they prey on other mollusks).

Species list
This list of species is based on the information in the World Register of Marine Species (WoRMS) list. Species within the genus Darioconus include:
 Darioconus leviteni Tucker, Tenorio & Chaney, 2011
 Darioconus aulicus (Linnaeus, 1758): synonym of  Conus aulicus Linnaeus, 1758
 Darioconus auratinus (da Motta, 1982): synonym of  Conus auratinus da Motta, 1982
 Darioconus auricomus (Hwass in Bruguière, 1792): synonym of  Conus auricomus Hwass in Bruguière, 1792
 Darioconus behelokensis (Lauer, 1989): synonym of  Conus behelokensis Lauer, 1989
 Darioconus bengalensis Okutani, 1968: synonym of  Conus bengalensis (Okutani, 1968)
 Darioconus crocatus (Lamarck, 1810): synonym of  Conus crocatus Lamarck, 1810
 Darioconus echo (Lauer, 1988): synonym of  Conus pennaceus echo Lauer, 1988
 Darioconus episcopatus (da Motta, 1982): synonym of  Conus episcopatus Da Motta, 1982
 Darioconus fortdauphinensis Bozzetti, 2015: synonym of Conus fortdauphinensis (Bozzetti, 2015)
 Darioconus lamberti (Souverbie, 1877): synonym of  Conus lamberti Souverbie, 1877
 Darioconus laueri Monnier & Limpalaër, 2013: synonym of Conus (Darioconus) laueri (Monnier & Limpalaër, 2013) represented as Conus laueri (Monnier & Limpalaër, 2013)
 Darioconus leviteni Tucker, Tenorio & Chaney, 2011: synonym of Conus (Darioconus) leviteni (Tucker, Tenorio & Chaney, 2011) represented as Conus leviteni (Tucker, Tenorio & Chaney, 2011)
 Darioconus lohri (Kilburn, 1972): synonym of  Conus lohri Kilburn, 1972
 Darioconus madagascariensis (G.B. Sowerby II, 1858): synonym of  Conus madagascariensis G. B. Sowerby II, 1858
 Darioconus magnificus (Reeve, 1843): synonym of  Conus magnificus Reeve, 1843
 Darioconus natalaurantius S. G. Veldsman, 2013: synonym of Conus (Darioconus) natalaurantius (S. G. Veldsman, 2013) represented as Conus natalaurantius (S. G. Veldsman, 2013)
 Darioconus omaria (Hwass in Bruguière, 1792): synonym of Conus (Darioconus) omaria Hwass in Bruguière, 1792 represented as Conus omaria Hwass in Bruguière, 1792
 Darioconus pennaceus (Born, 1778): synonym of  Conus pennaceus Born, 1778
 Darioconus textilis: synonym of Conus textile Linnaeus, 1758
 Darioconus thomae Gmelin, 1791:synonym of Conus (Darioconus) thomae Gmelin, 1791, represented as Conus thomae Gmelin, 1791

References

Further reading 
 Kohn A. A. (1992). Chronological Taxonomy of Conus, 1758-1840". Smithsonian Institution Press, Washington and London.
 Monteiro A. (ed.) (2007). The Cone Collector 1: 1-28.
 Berschauer D. (2010). Technology and the Fall of the Mono-Generic Family The Cone Collector 15: pp. 51-54
 Puillandre N., Meyer C.P., Bouchet P., and Olivera B.M. (2011), Genetic divergence and geographical variation in the deep-water Conus orbignyi complex (Mollusca: Conoidea)'', Zoologica Scripta 40(4) 350-363.

External links
 To World Register of Marine Species
  Gastropods.com: Conidae setting forth the genera recognized therein.

Conidae
Gastropod subgenera